Kevin Edward Hayes (19 November 1924 – 8 February 2011) was an Australian rules footballer who played with North Melbourne in the Victorian Football League (VFL).

Notes

External links 

1924 births
2011 deaths
Australian rules footballers from Victoria (Australia)
North Melbourne Football Club players